Ter Leede is a football club based in Sassenheim, Netherlands. The club was established on 30 April 1930, as a merger of the clubs Poellaan and Roda.

The men's team is currently playing in the Dutch Hoofdklasse, after being relegated from the Topklasse in 2013–14.

The women's team is playing in the women's Hoofdklasse, until the introduction of the Eredivisie for women's football in 2007 the highest level of women's football in the country. The women's team has won the national title four times and the KNVB Cup for women three times. In 2001–02, Ter Leede was the first Dutch team in the UEFA Women's Cup. The team finished in second place of Group 2, behind Ryazan WFC of Russia. The women's team also took part in 2003–04, finishing in second place in Group 8 (behind Fulham L.F.C.), and in 2004–05, finishing in third place in Group 4.

Honours

Women's team

National
 Hoofdklasse
 Winners (4): 2001, 2003, 2004, 2007
 Winner 2nd tier (2): 2009, 2010
 Dutch Cup
 Winners (3): 1992, 2001, 2007

UEFA Women's Cup

References

External links
Official website 

Football clubs in South Holland
Women's football clubs in the Netherlands
Association football clubs established in 1930
1930 establishments in the Netherlands
Ter Leede